Simply Red is  a British soul and pop band formed in Manchester in 1985. The lead vocalist of the band is singer and songwriter Mick Hucknall, who, by the time the band initially disbanded in 2010, was the only original member left. Since the release of their debut studio album Picture Book (1985), they have had ten songs reach top 10 in the UK Singles Chart, including "Holding Back the Years" and "If You Don't Know Me by Now", both of which reached number one on the US Billboard Hot 100. They have had five number one albums in the UK, with their 1991 album, Stars, being one of the best-selling albums in UK chart history.

At the 1992 and 1993 Brit Awards, they received the award for Best British Group. They received three Grammy Award nominations: for Best New Artist in 1987, and "Holding Back the Years" and "If You Don't Know Me by Now" for Best Pop Performance by a Duo or Group with Vocals. The band re-formed in 2015. Simply Red have sold over 50 million albums.

History

1977–1984: The Frantic Elevators
Hucknall was in a punk group called The Frantic Elevators, whose seven-year run produced limited releases on local labels and ended in 1984 upon critical acclaim for their final single, "Holding Back the Years".

1985–1988: Formation and early success
After the demise of The Frantic Elevators, Hucknall linked up with manager Elliot Rashman. By early 1985, Hucknall and Rashman had assembled a band of local session musicians and begun to attract record-company attention. The group went under a number of names: "World Service", "Red And The Dancing Dead", "Just Red" (after Hucknall's nickname "Red", denoting his hair colour) but Hucknall decided it would sound better with the addition of the word 'Simply'. The band's name is also linked to Hucknall's allegiance to being a supporter of Manchester United, as the club's home shirt colour is red.

The initial Simply Red line-up consisted of Mick Hucknall (vocals), David Fryman (guitar), Tony Bowers (bass), Fritz McIntyre (keyboards and vocals), Tim Kellett (brass and live backing vocals) and Chris Joyce (drums). Bowers and Joyce had both previously been members of post-punk bands The Durutti Column and The Mothmen; Kellett had also been a member of The Durutti Column, though not at the same time as Bowers and Joyce.

Simply Red signed a contract with Elektra in 1985, but after recording one track ("Red Box"), Fryman left the group and was replaced by guitarist Sylvan Richardson, billed as 'Sylvan'.

"Red Box" would eventually see release in 1985 as a B-side to the group's first single, "Money's Too Tight (to Mention)", a cover of a soul song originally recorded by The Valentine Brothers. "Money's Too Tight (to Mention)" gained international success, reaching the UK and Irish Top 20, then later the American, French and Dutch Top 30, and the Italian Top 5. It was included on their debut album, Picture Book, also released in 1985.

Several low-charting singles would follow for the band. Among the comparative flops was a re-recording of the Frantic Elevators' "Holding Back the Years", done up in a new soul-ballad style arrangement. Released as Simply Red's third single in 1985, the track initially placed outside the UK Top 50. However, upon being re-released in 1986, "Holding Back the Years" became a major hit, peaking at #1 in Ireland, #2 in the UK, #3 in the Netherlands, #20 in Italy and later #1 in the United States.

Simply Red's second album, 1987's Men and Women, saw the band adopting bowler hats and colourful suits instead of their earlier ragamuffin look. As well, the introspection and social commentary of their debut album was replaced by a blue-eyed soul sound with funk influences. Veteran Motown songwriter Lamont Dozier co-authored two tracks with Hucknall for the album—these tracks were credited to 'Hucknall/Dozier/Hucknall' in the original album credits, in homage to the famous Motown writing team of Holland/Dozier/Holland.

The album's lead single "The Right Thing" was another international hit, charting in the top 40 throughout Europe and North America.  Several follow-up singles also met with modest success in the UK and elsewhere.

1989–1995: Peak years
Guitarist Richardson left after the release of Men and Women and was replaced by Brazilian  Heitor Pereira (billed as Heitor TP). Saxophonist Ian Kirkham, who joined the group during the Picture Book tour in 1986 and played on Men and Women, became an official member.

With their third album A New Flame in 1989, Simply Red adopted a yet more mainstream popular sound aimed for commercial rather than critical success, typified by their cover of Harold Melvin & the Blue Notes' pop classic "If You Don't Know Me by Now", which became their second U.S. #1 hit, and one of the biggest singles of the year internationally; and their greatest success to that point.

Hucknall was by this time an international superstar, being photographed with models and Hollywood celebrities. This seemed to harm the band's coherence as a unit, with Hucknall declaring in 1991 that Simply Red was "essentially a solo project". The rhythm section of Bowers and Joyce left around this time; they were replaced by bassist Shaun Ward (ex-Floy Joy and Everyday People) and drummer Gota Yashiki (often billed as just Gota).

The band's career peaked in late 1991 with the release of Stars, which became the best-selling album for two years running in Europe and the UK (though notably had less chart success in the US than their previous albums, still earning however a gold certification). The album spun off five top 40 singles in the UK, and the singles "Something Got Me Started" and "Stars" were also significant chart hits throughout all of Europe, North America, Australia and New Zealand. After the tour, Tim Kellett left to form dance band Olive.

After touring and promoting Stars for two years, Simply Red returned in 1995 with "Fairground" (at Blackpool Pleasure Beach in Blackpool), a dance-influenced track prominently featuring a sample from Zki & Dobri's Goodmen project. A massive radio hit, "Fairground" went on to become the band's first and only UK #1. Its parent album Life sold more than a million copies in the UK alone, making it the fourth-biggest seller of the year. By this time, the band was officially Hucknall, McIntyre, Pereira, Kirkham, and new backing vocalist Dee Johnson. Guest musicians (including Sly & Robbie) filled in on drums and bass. For the subsequent live shows, Simply Red were joined by new recruits' Steve Lewinson on bass, Velroy Bailey on drums, and second backing vocalist Sarah Brown.

1996–2000
McIntyre, the only original remaining band member aside from lead singer Hucknall, left the group after the Life album, as did Pereira. From that time in 1996, Simply Red was essentially a trade name for Hucknall and a bevy of session musicians, which would vary from track to track (and gig to gig) as needed, although all post-1996 Simply Red albums and live shows did include contributions from sax player Ian Kirkham. Returning drummer Gota Yashiki (co-producing several album tracks) and backing vocalist Dee Johnson were also frequently involved with the band's later recordings and shows, as was new keyboardist/co-producer Andy Wright.

East West Records issued the compilation album Greatest Hits in 1996, reportedly against Hucknall's wishes. The album featured one new track, a cover of the 1973 Aretha Franklin hit "Angel" which was co-produced with The Fugees (who also served as backing musicians). Released as a single, "Angel" reached #4 in the UK.

1998 saw the release of the cover-heavy Blue, which produced four UK top 40 singles, including the top 10 hits "Say You Love Me" and "The Air That I Breathe". The follow-up album, 1999's Love and the Russian Winter, was a relative disappointment, spawning two minor hits that failed to break the top 10.

Simply Red were dropped from their label, East West Records in April 2000. Hucknall subsequently set up the website Simplyred.com to handle releases of new recordings; the new label/website venture proved to be quite successful, many of the band's Simplyred.com releases selling and charting almost as well as their earlier recordings.

2003–2010: Re-establishment as a live band and disbanding
Between 2003 and its disbandment in 2010, the band's official line-up for live performances was Mick Hucknall (vocals), Ian Kirkham (saxophone/keyboards), Dave Clayton (keyboards), Kenji Suzuki (guitar), Kevin Robinson (trumpet/flugelhorn/percussion), Steve Lewinson (bass guitar) and Pete Lewinson (drums). These musicians featured on Simply Red's albums as well, though they were often augmented or replaced by session musicians. From 2003 to 2008, John Johnson (trombone), Dee Johnson (vocals), Sarah Brown (vocals) and Chris De Margary (saxophone) also appeared on both albums and tours.

On 24 March 2003, the band released Home, a mixture of original songs and covers, including a version of The Stylistics' "You Make Me Feel Brand New", which hit UK #7. The album went Double Platinum in the United Kingdom, Gold in Canada, and Platinum in Europe. It featured two other hit singles: "Sunrise" (#7 UK) and "Fake" (#21 UK).

On 13 October 2005, followed Simplified, mainly an album of stripped-down versions of their classic hits.  The single "Perfect Love" made it to number 30 on the UK chart, the band's final top 30 placing.

On 12 March 2007, the band released its tenth (and, at that time, proclaimed final) studio album, Stay. This was preceded by the single from that album, "So Not Over You", released on 5 March 2007, which would peak at #34 in the UK. Follow-up single "Stay" (released on 28 May 2007) peaked at #36 UK, and was the band's final placing in the UK top 100 (although they would release several non-charting singles in the following years).

On 19 May 2008, Hucknall released his first solo album, Tribute to Bobby.  The backing musicians on the solo album were virtually the same group of musicians he had been working with as "Simply Red" for the last few years.

Hucknall announced that the name Simply Red would be retired after a farewell tour which started in early 2009 and ended in 2010.

Simply Red's final concert took place at the O2 Arena in London on 19 December 2010. The concert was shown live at cinemas throughout the UK.

2014–2015: Big Love and 30th anniversary reunion tour
On 3 November 2014, Simply Red announced that they would be reforming in Autumn 2015 for a 30th anniversary European tour, the "Big Love Tour 2015". The tour debuted on 20 October 2015 in Odense, Denmark, went on in 2016 as the "Big Love Tour 2016" and ended on 26 August 2016 at the Summerdays Festival in Arbon, Switzerland, performing the following month an ultimate show on 10 September 2016 at the BMW Festival Night in Munich, Germany. The line-up for the reunion tour was the same as Simply Red's last formation with the exception of Roman Roth replacing Pete Lewinson as drummer.

On 19 April 2015, the band announced that they would be releasing a new studio album (also) named Big Love, containing 12 new tracks. The new album was released on 29 May 2015.

2016–2018: Stars 25th anniversary tour and Symphonica In Rosso
On 11 November 2016, Simply Red embarked in Dublin, Ireland on the "25 Years of Stars Live" tour, celebrating the 25th anniversary of the release in September 1991 of Stars by playing live on stage the entire album in its original running order (while the second half of the show featured hits and classic Simply Red songs). The debut date in Ireland was followed by a 10-date UK leg starting on 13 November in Liverpool, England, and ending on 27 November at The O2 in London.

In 2017, they announced they would be headlining at the annual Symphonica In Rosso event on 25, 26 and 28 October. A live album of the concert, Symphonica in Rosso – Live at Ziggo Dome, Amsterdam, was released on 23 November 2018. The live album debuted and peaked at number 58 on the UK Albums Chart.

2019–2023: Blue Eyed Soul
The band's twelfth studio album, Blue Eyed Soul, was released on 8 November 2019. It debuted at number six on the UK Albums Chart, selling nearly 10,000 copies in its first week.

To support the album Simply Red announced concert dates for 2021 around the UK and Europe. However, these were postponed to 2022 and 2023 due to the COVID-19 pandemic.

On 18 May 2021, Simply Red released a new single, "Earth In A Lonely Space".

On 22 October 2022 Simply Red released their first remix album, Simply Red Remixed Vol. 1 (1985-2000).

2023: Time

On 2 March 2023 Simply Red announced the release of their thirteenth studio album, Time, for 26 May 2023. The lead single, "Better With You" was also released on 2 March 2023.

Awards and nominations
ARPA Music Awards

|-
| 1996
| "Fairground"
| Most Performed Foreign Work
| 

ASCAP Pop Music Awards

!Ref.
|-
| 1987
| rowspan=2|"Holding Back the Years"
| rowspan=2|Most Performed Song
| 
| 
|-
| 1988
| 
| 

Brit Awards

|-
| 1985
| Picture Book
| Best British Album
| 
|-
| rowspan="2" | 1987
| "Holding Back the Years"
| Best British Single
| 
|-
| rowspan="2" | Simply Red
| rowspan="2" |Best British Group
| 
|-
| rowspan="3" | 1990
| 
|-
| "If You Don't Know Me by Now"
| Best British Single
| 
|-
| A New Flame
| rowspan="2" | Best British Album
| 
|-
| rowspan="3" | 1992
| Stars
| 
|-
| "Stars"
| Best British Video
| 
|-
| rowspan="2" | Simply Red
| rowspan="2" | Best British Group
| 
|-
| rowspan="3" | 1993
| 
|-
| Mick Hucknall
| Best British Male
| 
|-
| "For Your Babies"
| Best British Video
| 
|-
| 1997
| Mick Hucknall
| Best British Male
| 

ECHO Awards

|-
| 1999
| rowspan="2" | Simply Red
| rowspan="2" | Best International Group
| 
|-
| 2004
| 

Goldene Europa

|-
| 2000
| Simply Red
| Group of the Year
| 

Grammy Awards

|-
| rowspan="2" | 1987
| Simply Red
| Best New Artist
| 
|-
| "Holding Back the Years"
| rowspan="2" | Best Pop Performance by a Duo or Group with Vocals
| 
|-
| 1990
| "If You Don't Know Me by Now"
| 

Hungarian Music Awards

|-
| 1996
| Life
| Best Foreign Album
| 

Ivor Novello Awards

|-
| rowspan="2" | 1992
| Mick Hucknall
| Songwriter of the Year
| 
|-
| "Stars"
| Best Song Musically & Lyrically
| 
|-
| 1996
| "Fairground"
| Best Selling Song
| 
|-
| 2002
| Simply Red
| Outstanding Song Collection
| 

Lunas del Auditorio

|-
| 2004
| rowspan=3|Themselves
| rowspan=3|Best Foreign Pop Artist
| 
|-
| 2009
| 
|-
| 2010
| 

MTV Video Music Awards

|-
| 1986
| "Holding Back the Years"
| Best New Artist
| 

Mercury Prize

|-
| 1992
| Stars
| Album of the Year
| 

Music & Media Year-End Awards

!Ref.
|-
| 1989
| Simply Red
| Group of the Year
| 
| 

Pollstar Concert Industry Awards

|-
| rowspan="2" | 1987
| Tour
| Small Hall Tour of the Year
| 
|-
| rowspan="2" | Simply Red
| rowspan="2" | Next Major Arena Headliner
| 
|-
| rowspan="2" | 1988
| 
|-
| Tour
| Small Hall Tour of the Year
|

Members
Current members
 Mick Hucknall – lead vocals, piano, guitar (1985–2010, 2015–present)
 Ian Kirkham – saxophone, EWI, keyboards (1986–2010, 2015–present)
 Steve Lewinson – bass, backing vocals (1995–1998, 2003–2010, 2015–present)
 Kenji Suzuki – guitars, backing vocals (1998–2010, 2015–present)
 Kevin Robinson – trumpet, flugelhorn, percussion, backing vocals (1999–2010, 2015–present)
 Roman Roth – drums, backing vocals (2015–present)

Former members

 Fritz McIntyre – keyboards, vocals (1985–1996, died 2021)
 Tim Kellett – trumpet, flugelhorn, keyboards, backing vocals, bass (1985–1994)
 Tony Bowers – bass (1985–1991)
 Chris Joyce – drums, percussion (1985–1991)
 David Fryman – guitars (1985)
 Sylvan Richardson – guitars (1985–1987)
 Aziz Ibrahim – guitars (1987–1988)
 Heitor Pereira – guitars (1988–1996)
 Gota Yashiki – drums, percussion (1991–1995, 1997–2003)
 Shaun Ward – bass, backing vocals (1991–1994)

 Dee Johnson – backing vocals (1991–2008)
 Velroy Bailey – drums (1995–1998)
 Sarah Brown – backing vocals (1995–2008)
 Tim Vine – keyboards, bass (1996–1999)
 John Johnson – trombone, percussion (1998–2008; died 2017)
 Mark Jaimes – guitars (1998–2003)
 Wayne Stobbart – bass (1998–2002)
 Chris De Margary – saxophone, flute (1998–2008)
 Andy Wright – keyboards, bass (1998–2002)
 Pete Lewinson – drums (2003–2010)
 Dave Clayton – keyboards (2003–2010, 2015–2022)

Timeline

Discography

Studio albums
 Picture Book (1985)
 Men and Women (1987)
 A New Flame (1989)
 Stars (1991)
 Life (1995)
 Blue (1998)
 Love and the Russian Winter (1999)
 Home (2003)
 Simplified (2005)
 Stay (2007)
 Big Love (2015)
 Blue Eyed Soul (2019)
 Time (2023)

See also
 List of artists who reached number one in the United States
 List of artists who reached number one on the U.S. dance chart
 List of Billboard number-one singles
 List of Billboard number-one dance hits

References

External links

 
 Simply Red at WorldMusicDatabase
 Spanish website
 
 

Brit Award winners
British soft rock music groups
British soul musical groups
East West Records artists
Elektra Records artists
English pop music groups
Musical groups established in 1984
Musical groups disestablished in 2010
Musical groups reestablished in 2015
Musical groups from Manchester
Sophisti-pop musical groups